Nikos Hatzigiakoumis (1930 – 2 January 2023) was a Greek rower. He competed in the men's single sculls event at the 1956 Summer Olympics.

References

External links
 

1930 births
2023 deaths
Greek male rowers
Olympic rowers of Greece
Rowers at the 1956 Summer Olympics
People from Rhodes
Sportspeople from the South Aegean